Dadgar is a surname of Persian origin. People with the surname include:

 Azadeh Bokaie Dadgar (born 1980), Iranian lawyer and journalist
 Hossein Dadgar (1889–1971), Iranian politician

See also
 Dadgar (disambiguation)

Surnames of Iranian origin